Marr College (Scottish Gaelic: Colaiste Mhàrr) is a co-educational secondary school in Troon, South Ayrshire, Scotland. It is owned by the Marr Trust and is operated by South Ayrshire Council which was transferred to then Strathclyde Regional Council in 1975, with South Ayrshire Council being responsible for providing the educational provisional provided by the school. The school was gifted to the town of Troon by Charles Kerr Marr.

Throughout 2016-2017, it underwent extensive restoration works including a new build extending on from the original school building. In 2021, 991 pupils attend Marr College.

In 2022, Marr College was ranked as the 68th best performing state school in Scotland, a drop from 35th in the 2021 rankings. Despite this, Marr College outperformed other secondary schools in South Ayrshire and is regarded as the best performing secondary school in South Ayrshire.

History
Marr College was built and established using the money left from Charles Kerr Marr, a native of Troon who believed that people should be educated together, no matter their background and levels of wealth. The creation of Marr College has long been regarded as the model that paved the way for state comprehensive schools as this was created long before the establishment of state comprehensive schools became a political ambition. Whilst at first the school was run by a board of governors, it still provided free education in a traditional Scottish manner. Pupils from all areas of Troon attended the school despite their backgrounds.

Marr College lost its anomalous direct-grant status in 1978 and became a Strathclyde Region run school. When Strathclyde was abolished in 1996, the newly formed South Ayrshire Council took over the responsibility of the school, delegating much responsibility to the school's Head Teacher.

Whilst much of the original building remains standing and intact, much of the building had fallen into a state to disrepair. Throughout 2016-2017, the school underwent a substantial period of renovation and new building blocks undertaken by South Ayrshire Council to improve the educational facilities and learning environments to bring the build up to date with other newly built schools in the area and to improve educational outcomes for the pupils. The improved updates, estimated at a cost of £37 million (in 2017 terms), has seen new facilities added to the existing Marr College estate such as a new sports hall, new teaching wing and improved landscaping around the school estate. In July 2017, prior to renovation, the school roll was 921 pupils. After, with new wing, capacity rose to 1350.

Refurbishment and extension

The condition of the Marr College building has been well known and a matter of concern to South Ayrshire Council. In 2001, Marr College was included on a list of schools within South Ayrshire for consideration to be included on the Public Private Partnership bid to South Ayrshire Council – a bid which would have seen an entirely new state of the art school estate constructed. Due to community issues such as disagreements on which proposal would represent best value to the community, the bid could not proceed. In 2008, Turner Townsend commissioned a report entitled Fit for Purpose which highlighted a serious number of concerns in terms of the condition of the current buildings which make up the Marr College campus. Many members of the Troon community believed that the issues relating to the condition of the Marr College estate was due to negligence and neglect on South Ayrshire Council's part. In response, a council representative issued a statement that South Ayrshire Council, for as far as their budget has allowed, has maintained the original Marr College building which has seen a number of improvements including upgraded roofing and new and more energy efficient window replacements.

Whilst a new Marr College campus has not been constructed, there have long been concerns from members of the Troon community and parents with children attending the school that the current school building is overcrowded. South Ayrshire Council acknowledge and agree on this point, but highlighted that when South Ayrshire (then Strathclyde Regional Council) took over Marr College in 1975, the increase in pupil roll was addressed by implementing hut classrooms and extending parts of the school to meet the needs of the local community.

On 29 November 2017 the £37 million new extension of Marr College was officially opened by John Swinney, Deputy First Minister of Scotland and Cabinet Secretary for Education and Skills. The work was completed as part of a £94 million pipeline of works being delivered across South Ayrshire school estates.

Uniform
The school uniform policy for Marr College is as follows:

The following items of clothing are deemed to be desirable modes of dress for learning:
 Marr College blazer
 White shirt and school tie
 Black or grey trousers or skirt (of a reasonable length)
 Black, flat shoes that have the toes covered. Trainers are not acceptable for normal school wear. [a]

[a] Despite the uniform policy stating black shoes, many boys at Marr College opt to wear brown, smart brogue type shoes

For Physical Education and Games, the minimum following kit is required:

 Shorts (dark)
 Marr College PE T-Shirt (available to order from school office)
 Sports socks (white)
 Trainers

Management team
The management team at Marr College consists of one head teacher, five depute head teachers and several principal teachers of individual subjects and principal teachers of guidance. The management team is as follows:

Head Teacher
 George Docherty

Depute Head Teachers
 R Anderson 
 G Hobson
 G McCallum
 N McLean
 I Ward

Notable former pupils

Ronni Ancona, actress
Tom Brighton, footballer
Gordon Brown, rugby player
Gordon Burns, footballer
Andrew Cotter, sports presenter
Alan Hutton, footballer
Donald Jack, writer
Marysia Kay, actress
Tom Morton, writer and broadcaster
Neil Murray, footballer
Jamie Ness, footballer
Steve Nicol, footballer
Michael Russell, politician
Tom Walsh, footballer
Brian Whittle, athlete
Susannah York, actress
Innes Cameron, Footballer
Rory McKenzie, Footballer

See also
 Marr College RFC

References

External links
 
 Marr College
 Marr College's page on Scottish Schools Online

Secondary schools in South Ayrshire

Troon